Puca or PUCA may refer to
Púca, faery creature of Celtic folklore.
 Puka (Peru), also spelled Puca, a mountain in Peru
Puck (mythology), fairy or mischievous nature sprite in English folklore (possibly related to Púca)
Florin Pucă (1932–1990), Romanian graphic artist
Central American Unionist Party (Partido Unionista Centroamericano), center-right Nicaraguan political party
Diketo (game) or puca, a game similar to Jacks from South Africa